Valery Mukhamedovich Kokov (October 18, 1941 – October 29, 2005) was a Soviet and Russian politician of Kabardian ethnicity.

Early life and political career 

Kokov was born in Tyrnyauz, Kabardino-Balkaria. He was the leader of Kabardino-Balkaria from 1990 to 2005. He was chairman of the republic's supreme Soviet from 1990 to 1991 and was elected President for the first time in 1992.

He effectively neutralized opposition and was re-elected twice in landslide victories; in 1997 with 98% of the vote and in 2002 with 87% of the vote. He successfully maintained stability in the republic though it is close to the war-torn republic of Chechnya. Kokov suffered from cancer for several years before his death. On Feberary 23, 2005, he announced his resignation.

Resignation and Death 
He did not give any reason for his departure, which came nearly a year and a half before the end of his term. He stayed in office until his successor, Arsen Kanokov was chosen two weeks later. During October 2005 his health rapidly declined and he died in the central clinical hospital in Moscow of cancer, a month after leaving office. He is survived by his daughter, son and his wife.

Personal life 
Kokov was married to Violetta Taubievna Kokova, and they had one daughter and one son, Kazbek Kokov, who became head of KBR in 2018.

Honours and awards 
 Order "For Merit to the Fatherland";
2nd class (9 May 2005) - for outstanding contribution strengthening Russian statehood and many years of diligent work
3rd class (15 October 2001) - for outstanding contribution strengthening Russian statehood, friendship and cooperation between nations
 Order of Friendship of Peoples (25 March 1994) - for his great personal contribution to strengthening Russian statehood and stability of international relations in the Kabardino-Balkarian Republic
 Order of the Red Banner of Labour
 Order "Honor and Glory", 2nd class (Abkhazia, 2003)
 Diploma of the Government of the Russian Federation (11 October 2001) - for his great personal contribution to the economy of Kabardino-Balkaria and long-term fruitful work

Kokov's name has been used:
 Kabardino-Balkarian State Agricultural Academy named VM Kokov, Nalchik
    
 Streets in Volgograd, Grozny and Dygulybgey, Baksan region, Kabardino-Balkaria

1941 births
2005 deaths
People from Elbrussky District
Central Committee of the Communist Party of the Soviet Union members
Heads of the Kabardino-Balkarian Republic
Members of the Federation Council of Russia (1994–1996)
Members of the Federation Council of Russia (1996–2000)
Recipients of the Order "For Merit to the Fatherland", 2nd class
Recipients of the Order "For Merit to the Fatherland", 3rd class
Recipients of the Order of Friendship of Peoples
Recipients of the Order of the Red Banner of Labour
Circassian people of Russia
Our Home – Russia politicians
United Russia politicians
Deaths from cancer in Russia